Charlotte de La Marck (5 November 1574 – 15 May 1594) was a ruling Princess of Sedan and a Duchess of Bouillon in her own right between 1588 and 1594.  Her titles and the principality of Sedan passed in to the House of La Tour d'Auvergne through her marriage without issue.

Biography

The last surviving child of Henri-Robert de la Marck Duke of Bouillon and Françoise de Bourbon. She was a member of the House of La Marck. Her older brother Guillaume-Robert died without surviving issue, and as such, Charlotte became the heiress to the Duchy of Bouillon, the Principality of Sedan and various other titles in 1588.

Her marriage was arranged by King Henri IV himself. Her husband was the son of the Viscount of Turenne and Eléonore de Montmorency, daughter of Anne de Montmorency. The couple were married on 19 November 1591. Upon marriage, her spouse became her co-ruler and shared her titles.

She died giving birth to a son who died the very same day. Charlotte herself died a week after. She was buried at the Church of Saint-Laurent in Sedan.

Her husband later claimed the Duchy of Bouillon as his own and in 1676, his grand son Godefroy Maurice de La Tour d'Auvergne officially received Bouillon and Sedan. The Bouillon line of the House of La Marck died out with Charlotte.

Ancestry

References

1574 births
1594 deaths
Charlotte
Charlotte
French Roman Catholics
16th-century French people
Bouillon, Duchess of, Charlotte de La Marck
Dukes of Bouillon
16th-century women rulers
People of the French Wars of Religion
Deaths in childbirth